Makatu (also romanized as Makatū) is a village in Charuymaq-e Shomalesharqi Rural District, in the Central District of Hashtrud County, East Azerbaijan Province, Iran. At the 2006 census, its population was 168, in 41 families.

Name 
According to Vladimir Minorsky, the name "Makatu" is derived from the Mongolian word meketü, meaning "sly".

References 

Towns and villages in Hashtrud County